The Cincinnati Steam Paper Mill was the first steam mill in Cincinnati, Ohio, established in  and owned by the Messrs. Phillips & Spear company. It provided paper for the surrounding area as well as surplus shipped to New Orleans, Louisiana.

References

Manufacturing companies established in 1825
1825 establishments in Ohio
Pulp and paper mills in the United States
Defunct companies based in Cincinnati
Defunct pulp and paper companies
History of Cincinnati
Office buildings in Cincinnati